The International Journal of Applied Philosophy is a biannual peer-reviewed academic journal that publishes philosophical examinations of practical problems. It was established in 1982, and contains original articles, reviews, and edited discussions of topics of general interest in ethics and applied philosophy. The journal is published by the Philosophy Documentation Center, and some articles are published in co-operation with the Association for Practical and Professional Ethics.

Subject coverage
The journal covers issues in business, education, the environment, government, health care, law, psychology, and science. Special issue topical coverage has included abortion, animal rights, gambling, lying, terrorism, torture, and the foreign policy of the United States.

Abstracting and indexing 
The journal is abstracted and indexed in:

See also 
 List of ethics journals
 List of philosophy journals

References

External links 
 

Biannual journals
English-language journals
Philosophy journals
Publications established in 1982
Philosophy Documentation Center academic journals
Applied philosophy
Environmental humanities journals
Environmental philosophy
1982 establishments in the United States